The 1973–74 FA Cup was the 93rd season of the world's oldest football cup competition, the Football Association Challenge Cup, commonly known as the FA Cup. Liverpool won the competition for only the second time, beating Newcastle United 3–0 in the final at Wembley, London.

Matches were scheduled to be played at the stadium of the team named first on the date specified for each round, which was always a Saturday. Some matches, however, might be rescheduled for other days if there were clashes with games for other competitions or the weather was inclement. In this season matches were allowed to be played on Sundays for the first time. If scores were level after 90 minutes had been played, a replay would take place at the stadium of the second-named team later the same week. If the replayed match was drawn further replays would be held until a winner was determined. If scores were level after 90 minutes had been played in a replay, a 30-minute period of extra time would be played.

Calendar

Results

First round proper

At this stage clubs from the Football League Third and Fourth Divisions joined 28 non-league clubs having come through the qualifying rounds. To complete this round, Scarborough, Wigan Athletic, Walton & Hersham and Slough Town were given byes as finalists of FA Trophy and FA Amateur Cup of the last season. Matches were scheduled to be played on Saturday, 24 November 1973. Ten matches were drawn and went to replays.

Second round proper 
The matches were scheduled for Saturday, 15 December 1973. Five matches were drawn, with replays taking place later the same week.

Third round proper
The 44 First and Second Division clubs entered the competition at this stage. The matches were scheduled for the weekend of 5–6 January 1974. Thirteen matches were drawn, of which one required a second replay. Holders Sunderland were eliminated by Carlisle United.

Fourth round proper
The matches were scheduled for Saturday, 26 January 1974. Four matches were, however, played the day after. Eight matches were drawn, of which one, the tie between Portsmouth and Leyton Orient, required a second replay.

Fifth Round Proper
The matches were scheduled for Saturday, 16 February 1974 with one taking place the day after. Two matches were drawn and went to replays.

Sixth Round Proper

The four quarter-final ties were played on 9 March 1974.

Newcastle United pitch invasion

The first Newcastle United–Nottingham Forest game at St James' Park was won 4–3 by Newcastle. However, early in the second half Nottingham Forest went 3–1 up from a penalty awarded by the referee, Gordon Kew, who also sent off Newcastle's defender Pat Howard for protesting the decision. The Newcastle United fans in the Leazes End of the ground (now the Sir John Hall stand) invaded the pitch. Two Nottingham Forest players were injured in the debacle, but the referee waited until all players were recovered and received the permission of both managers to continue the tie. Newcastle managed to come back and win with a late goal by their captain, Bobby Moncur, in spite of the two-goal and one-player deficit. Up to 23 people were taken to hospital as a result of the pitch invasion, of whom two had fractured skulls; another 103 people were treated at the ground and 39 arrests were made.

Following the riot, a written protest was sent from Nottingham Forest to the FA on 11 March. In response, the secretary of the FA, Ted Croker, announced that a special four-man subcommittee of the Challenge Cup Committee who oversee the FA Cup competition were to investigate the incident, stating, "Newcastle could be disqualified. We do not have the power to order a replay as the game was completed." On 14 March the subcommittee ruled that, in spite of Mr. Croker's comments, the match was to be replayed, at the neutral venue of Goodison Park on Monday 18 March. If that match was drawn then extra time would be played and, if needed, another match at a neutral venue would be played the following Thursday. This decision was unprecedented at the time and the reaction was mixed, with Newcastle's defender Frank Clark suggesting that their comeback should have allowed them to go through outright. The Nottingham Forest captain Bob Chapman stated, "we would have won it fair and square but for the trouble."

The first replay was a nervous 0–0 draw after extra time, although Newcastle hit the woodwork three times. Newcastle finally won the tie through a single Malcolm Macdonald goal in the second replay, also at Goodison Park.

Results

Semi-finals
The semi-final matches were played on Saturday, 30 March 1974 with the Liverpool–Leicester City game being replayed four days later. Liverpool and Newcastle United won their respective matches to go on to the final at Wembley.

Replay

Third place playoff
Between 1970 and 1974, a third place playoff between the two losing semi-finalists was held.

Final

The final took place on Saturday, 4 May 1974 at Wembley and ended in a victory for Liverpool over Newcastle United by three goals to nil. Two goals were scored by Kevin Keegan and one by Steve Heighway. The attendance was 100,000.

TV Coverage
The right to show FA Cup games were, as with Football League matches, shared between the BBC and ITV network. All games were shown in a highlights format, except the Final, which was shown live both on BBC1 & ITV. The BBC football highlights programme Match Of The Day would show up to three games and the various ITV regional network stations would cover up to one game and show highlights from other games covered elsewhere on the ITV network. No games from Rounds 1 or 2 were shown. Burnley banned TV Coverage of the R5 tie v Aston Villa which was due to be one of the ITV televised ties and shown by Granada and the quarter-final tie v Wrexham which was due to be shown on BBC MOTD, they showed a League game instead between Derby County v West Ham United as well as the Queens Park Rangers v Leicester Quarter-final. Burnley and Chairman Bob Lord also tried to stop the semi-final being covered by ITV but couldn't as the game was played at neutral Sheffield Wednesday.
Third Round BBC Wolverhampton Wanderers v Leeds United, West Ham United v Hereford United, Manchester United v Plymouth Argyle, Hendon v Newcastle United (Midweek-replay played in the Afternoon at Watford), Hereford United v West Ham United (Midweek replay played in the afternoon) ITV Chelsea v Queens Park Rangers (LWT), Everton v Blackburn Rovers (Granada), Leicester City v Tottenham Hotspur ATV), Sheffield Wednesday v Coventry City (Yorkshire), Newcastle United v Hendon (Tyne-Tees), Peterborough United v Southend United (Anglia) Fourth Round BBC Queens Park Rangers v Birmingham City, Fulham v Leicester City, Manchester United v Ipswich Town ITV Arsenal v Aston Villa (LWT & ATV), Peterborough United v Leeds United (Anglia  Yorkshire),Liverpool v Carlisle United (Granada), Newcastle United v Scunthorpe United (Tyne-Tees), Aston Villa v Arsenal(Midweek-replay shown in all regions) Fifth Round BBC Bristol City v Leeds United, West Bromwich Albion v Newcastle United, Liverpool v Ipswich Town ITV  Luton Town v Leicester City (LWT & Anglia), Southampton v Wrexham (Southern & HTV), Coventry City v Queens Park Rangers (ATV), Leeds United v Bristol City ((Midweek-replay played in the afternoon shown in all regions) Sixth Round BBC Queens Park Rangers v Leicester City  ITV Bristol City v Liverpool (LWT Coverage outside region on two non London teams), Newcastle United v Nottingham Forest (Tyne-Tees & ATV) Newcastle United v Nottingham Forest (Midweek rematch & replay shown in all regions) Semi-finals BBC Leicester City v Liverpool, Leicester City v Liverpool (Midweek replay), ITV Burnley v Newcastle United (All ITV Regions)Final Liverpool v Newcastle United Shown Live on BBC & ITV.

References
General
The FA Cup Archive at TheFA.com
English FA Cup 1973/74 at Soccerbase
F.A. Cup results 1973/74 at Footballsite
Specific

 
FA Cup seasons
Fa
Eng